Amar Mitra (  (born 30 August 1951) is an eminent writer in Bengali living in Kolkata, West Bengal, India. A student of chemistry, he has been working for the Land Reforms Department of The Government of West Bengal. He was awarded with Sahitya Akademi Award for his novel Dhurbaputra in 2006. Awarded  with 2022 O' Henry prize  for  his   short  story,  The  Old man of Kusumpur (  গাঁওবুড়ো).[ ref: https://lithub.com/announcing-the-winners-of-the-2022-o-henry-prize-for-short-fiction/]. He is  the  first Indian language  recipient   of O' Henry prize  for  short fiction. His  novel  Dhapatir Char   has  been   translated   in to English   and   published  by  Penguin Random  House,  in their vintage   section.

References 

https://lithub.com/announcing-the-winners-of-the-2022-o-henry-prize-for-short-fiction/

External links 
http://sahitya-akademi.gov.in/sahitya-akademi/showSearchAwardsResult.jsp?year=&author=&awards=AA&language=BENGALI

Living people
Bengali writers
1951 births
Writers from West Bengal